Voynyagovo is a village in central southern Bulgaria, part of Karlovo Municipality, Plovdiv Province. As of 2008, it has a population of 1,260.

History 
Legend has it that the founder of the village was the boyar Voyneg, who gathered the huts scattered along Sredna Gora in a village.  The village in the time of the Second Bulgarian Kingdom had the status of a military settlement. By 1829 part of the population of Voynyagovo emigrated with the Russian troops of Gen. Dibic-Zabalkanski during their withdrawal in Bessarabia, in the villages of Kamber and Baskoy (now Romania). Revolutionary and national hero Vasil Levski was a teacher in the village, and a Vasil Levski Culture Centre was established in 1900.

Religion 
There is a Church of Saint Dimitar, an Orthodox church, in the village.

References

Villages in Plovdiv Province
Karlovo